The 1993–94 Algerian Cup is the 30th edition of the Algerian Cup. JS Kabylie are the defending champions, having beaten ASO Chlef 1–0 in the previous season's final.

Round of 64

Round of 32

Round of 16

Quarter-finals

Semi-finals

Final

Match

References

Algerian Cup
Algerian Cup
Algerian Cup